Uncle Vanya is a 1970 film adaptation of the 1899 Anton Chekhov play of the same title and directed by Andrey Konchalovskiy.

Plot summary 

Serebryakov, a retired professor and his beautiful, much younger second wife, Yelena, visit their country estate, which funds their urban lifestyle. Vanya, brother of the Professor's first wife, who manages the farm estate, and the local Doctor Astrov, both fall under Yelena's spell, while complaining of the endless ennui of their provincial existence. Astrov is an experienced physician who performs his job conscientiously, but has lost all idealism and spends much of his time drinking. Sofya, the Professor's daughter by his first wife, who works to keep the estate going with her uncle Vanya, meanwhile suffers from lack of esteem over what she sees as her own lack of beauty, and from an unrequited love for Dr. Astrov. Matters are brought to a head  when the Professor announces his intention to sell the estate, Vanya and Sofya's home, to achieve a higher income for himself and his wife.

Differences from play

Cast 
Innokenti Smoktunovsky as Ivan "Uncle Vanya" Voinitsky
Sergei Bondarchuk as Dr. Mikhail Lvovich Astrov
Irina Kupchenko as Sofia "Sonya" Aleksandrovna Serebryakova
Irina Miroshnichenko as Helena (Yelena) Andreevna Serebryakova
Irina Anisimova-Wulf as Mariya Vasilievna Voinitskaya
Yekaterina Mazurova as Marina Timofeyevna
Nikolai Pastukhov as Iliya Ilich Telyegin
Vladimir Zeldin as Professor Aleksandr Vladimirovich Serebryakov

Critical reception
The New York Times wrote, "this "Uncle Vanya" is an exceedingly graceful, beautifully acted production that manages to respect Chekhov as a man of his own time, as well as what I would assume to be the Soviet view of Chekhov as Russia's saddest, gentlest, funniest and most compassionate revolutionary playwright...For the most part, the film proceeds at Chekhov's own pace as the camera, which has the presence of a household intimate, follows the action in close-up, sometimes overhearing scenes from adjoining rooms, sometimes, as if by chance, becoming so involved in the action that it doesn't remember to give us an establishing shot until a scene is almost completed...Because there have been so few screen adaptations of Chekhov's plays seen here, it doesn't mean as much as I wish it did to say that the new Russian film version of "Uncle Vanya," which opened yesterday at the Regency Theater, is probably the best filmed Chekhov I've ever seen."
TV Guide noted  "a slow but insightful version of Chekhov... The film is wordy and somewhat claustrophobic in its near-exclusive use of indoor locations. Bondarchuk is not only one of the top post-WW II Russian actors but also a respected director, who directed War and Peace, the eight-and-a-half-hour, $40 million epic version of Tolstoy's novel. This was the first US release for Andrei Konchalovsky, who would go on to work in the US on films such as Runaway Train; Shy People; and Tango and Cash.

Soundtrack

References

External links 

1970 films
1970 drama films
Soviet drama films
Russian drama films
1970s Russian-language films
Soviet black-and-white films
Films based on Uncle Vanya
Mosfilm films
Films directed by Andrei Konchalovsky
Russian black-and-white films